Dinesh Baboo (also known as Dinesh Babu) is an Indian film director, cinematographer, actor and screenwriter who works predominantly in Kannada cinema. In a career spanning five decades he has directed more than 40 films, filmed more than 20 films and been the scriptwriter for 6 films. He is the recipient of several accolades including two Karnataka State Film Awards, two Filmfare Awards South and two Cinema Express Awards.

Baboo has created many critical and commercially successful films, like Suprabhatha, Idu Saadhya, Hendthighelbedi, Amrutha Varshini, Laali, Nishyabda, Abhi, Chitra, Hollywood, Magic Ajji, Neenello Naanalle and Bellary Naga. His 1989 comedy-thriller film Inspector Vikram was an average grosser at the time of release but as over the years attained a cult status. He has also been the cinematographer for many commercially successful films, like Paadu Nilave, Ninaive Oru Sangeetham, Dhruvam, Ammayane Sathyam, Commissioner, Pidakkozhi Koovunna Noottandu and The King.

Career

Cinematographer
His career in cinema started as a cinematographer. He stood behind the camera for noted Malayalam film blockbusters like Dhruvam, Ullasa Poonkattu and the 1994 blockbuster Commissioner which was instrumental in raising Suresh Gopi, to stardom. His most successful film as a cinematographer was the Shaji Kailas' 1995 blockbuster The King , which was the highest grossing Malayalam film at the time.

Great talent in cinematography was the springboard that launched him to great success in the world of cinema. This also helped him to have first hand knowledge of every technical aspect of cinema, which a director need not be necessarily familiar with. He also directed a Malayalam film named Mazhavillu starring Kunchacko Boban and Preeti Jhangiani.  Although his camera skills were widely appreciated in Mollywood, his ambition took him to the world of Kannada films where he chose to direct rather than handle the camera.

Director
His directorial career in the Kannada film world took off with Suprabhatha  - a film with Vishnuvardhan and Suhasini which became a box office hit creating many records and gave a major boost to the career of Dinesh babu. His next movie was the hugely successful thriller Idu Saadhya in 1989. The movie, featuring eight stars, was made on a shoestring budget of just 1.5 million INR and shot at a single location within 36 hours  then creating a record for the fastest completion of an Indian film. He followed it up with the comedy cop thriller - Inspector Vikram - which was a first of its kind in Kannada cinema at that time. Though an average success at the time of its release, the movie has gained cult following among the viewers over the years. As a director, his craftsmanship has been lauded by columnists and reviewers - especially for his screenplay which revolves around very few locations and for successfully blending the comedy and thriller genre.

Actor
He appeared in front of the camera for the first time as a Police officer in the film Accident which is Directed by Ramesh Aravind.

Filmography

Films
Cinematographer only

Director only

Television
Mane Mane Kathe 
Akansha
Swati Muttu

References

External links
 
 
 https://m.dailyhunt.in/news/india/malayalam/malayalivartha+new-epaper-malvart/kannadayile+prashastha+sinima+samvidhayakande+makalaya+anjanayum+bijuvum+thammil+pranaya+vivahitharayathin+pinnale+villanayethiyath+achande+sahodhara+puthran+bharthavinde+maranashesham+aabhichara+kriyakalkkum+manthravadhathinumoduvil+yuvathiyude+aduthethi+bijuvinepole+samsarikkukayum+anukarikkukayum+cheyth+thande+dhehath+aathmav+kudiyittundennum+thanan+bijuvennum+parany+vishvasippichu+nigudathakalude+churulazhiyumbol+bijuvine+konnatho+samshayangal+bakkiyakumbol+arunin+anjana+svanthamayath+ingane-newsid-112498788

Living people
Kannada film directors
Malayalam film directors
Kannada film cinematographers
Malayalam film cinematographers
Filmfare Awards South winners
Film directors from Thiruvananthapuram
Film producers from Thiruvananthapuram
20th-century Indian film directors
21st-century Indian film directors
20th-century Indian photographers
21st-century Indian photographers
Indian television directors
Cinematographers from Kerala
Screenwriters from Thiruvananthapuram
Kannada screenwriters
Year of birth missing (living people)